Derrick Baker, also known as Chilly Chill, is an American hip hop music producer who has worked for Ice Cube, Snoop Dogg, Ice-T, Rick James, RBX, Ike Turner, Public Enemy, Kurupt, Jewel,  Yo-Yo, WC, Korn, 7th Veil, Kool Keith, Da Lench Mob, Lupe Fiasco, Bun B, and more.

History
Chilly Chill is an original member of the West Coast group the Lench Mob along with Ice Cube, Yo-Yo, Sir Jinx and others. The Lench Mob was formed after Ice Cube left N.W.A. The Lench Mob featured Ice Cube's videos and songs on his debut album Amerikkka's Most Wanted. Chilly Chill produced many of the tracks on that album and also Death Certificate and Kill at Will.

Credits 

Ice Cube – AmeriKKKa's Most Wanted
Ice Cube – Kill At Will
Ice Cube – Death Certificate
Ice Cube – The Predator
Ice Cube – Bootlegs & B.Sides
Ice Cube – Greatest Hits
Ice Cube – The Collection
Ice Cube – The Albums That Shook A Nation
Yo Yo – Dope Feminity
Yo Yo – Make Way For The Motherload
Yo Yo – Ya Can't Play With My Yo Yo
Yo Yo – Ain't Nobody Better
WC and the Maad Circle – Ain't A Damn Thang Changed
WC and the Maad Circle – You Don't Work, U Don't Eat
Da Lench Mob – Guerillas In Tha Mist
Mack 10 – Foe Life
Very Best Of 89 09 – No Sleep Til Compton
RBX – The Shining
RBX feat KORN – Ruff N Nuff
RBX – Born Wild
RBX – California
Kool Keith & HBomb – 7th Veil
Kool Keith & H Bomb – Stoned
H Bomb feat Snoop Dogg – What U Gonna Do
Ice-T feat Chilly Chill – 6am remix
Kool Keith & HBomb feat Rick James – So Blunted
HBomb feat Ike Turner – Play It Cool
Hbomb feat Roscoe Kurupt & Jewell – Money
HBomb feat Kurupt – About
HBomb feat Silkk The Shocker – Soldier
HBomb feat Flava Flav – Fuck The Industry
Gucci Mane feat Chilly Chill – Ghetto

Bun B – Pimp Proud
Epiphany Pictures Inc / Calvin Records – Road Kings soundtrack
Yo Yo – Stand Up For Your Rights
 Yo Yo – What Can I Do
WC and the Maad Circle – Dress Code
WC and the Maad Circle – Ghetto Serenade
Ice Cube – How To Survive In South Central
The Ultimate Death Row Collection /Wideawake Death Row Records – Ain't Got No Time

References

External links 
 Official website
https://www.discogs.com/artist/175467-Chilly-Chill?filter_anv=0&type=Credits
http://thesource.com/2016/10/22/video-chilly-chill-and-threi-from-lenchmob-trickin-off
http://steadydippin.com/rappers/chilly-chill/

American hip hop record producers
Living people
Rappers from Los Angeles
21st-century American rappers
WC and the Maad Circle members
Record producers from California
1969 births